Carlos Álvarez Rivera (born 6 August 2003) is a Spanish professional footballer who plays as a midfielder for Sevilla Atlético.

Club career
Born in Sanlúcar la Mayor, Seville, Andalusia, Carlos Álvarez Rivera is a Sevilla FC youth graduate. On 21 December 2022 he scored on his debut for the senior team in a 3–0 Copa del Rey win against Juventud Torremolinos. He made his La Liga debut on 8 January 2023, replacing Óliver Torres in a 2–1 home win against Getafe CF.

International career
Álvarez is a youth international for Spain, having represented the Spain U16s, Spain U17s and Spain U19s.

References

External links
 
 

2003 births
Living people
Sportspeople from the Province of Seville
Spanish footballers
Association football midfielders
La Liga players
Primera Federación players
Segunda División B players
Segunda Federación players
Sevilla Atlético players
Sevilla FC players